The Squallis Puppeteers are a Louisville, Kentucky based puppetry troupe.  The troupe was founded by Jess Myers, Nora and Carrie Christenson in 1997.  Their performances include a yearly Fool's Day Bash, held on April Fools' Day.  They became a non-profit organization in 2003.  Squallis uses donations, grants, and everyday materials to form together huge, creative, 7-feet-tall extravagant puppets as well as puppet shows.

On the first Saturday of every month Squallis opens its doors to the public, where they offer a family-friendly environment, puppet performance, and a kids puppet making workshop.

Puppets made by Squallis
Large Puppets
Owl
Giraffe
Cyclopes
Abe Lincoln
Bear
Skeleton
These puppets are visible to the public at different times throughout the seasons. They are featured at the Louisville Zoo, band performances, and some of Squallis's partnership programs as well.

See also
 List of attractions and events in the Louisville metropolitan area

References

External links
Squallis Puppeteers website
No Foolin', it's a puppet party
Squallis Puppeteers on KET Mixed Media
Kentucky Arts Council page on Squallis Puppeteers
A hands on job: Interest in expanding puppeteers led to founding of Squallis Puppeteers

Arts organizations based in Louisville, Kentucky
Arts organizations established in 1997
Puppet troupes
1997 establishments in Kentucky
Non-profit organizations based in Louisville, Kentucky
Puppetry in the United States